The 1928 Western Kentucky State Normal Hilltoppers football team represented Western Kentucky State Normal School and Teachers College (now known as Western Kentucky University) in the 1928 college football season.  They were coached by legendary basketball coach Edgar Diddle in his last season as football coach.  This team defeated all other Kentucky teams on its schedule and claimed to be state champions. Turner Elrod, Paul Taylor, and Lynn Williams were named to the All Kentucky Team.

Schedule

References

Western Kentucky State Normal
Western Kentucky Hilltoppers football seasons
Western Kentucky State Normal Hilltoppers football